This article lists important figures and events in Malaysian public affairs during the year 2007, together with births and deaths of notable Malaysians. 2007 marked 50 years of Malaysian independence.

Incumbent political figures

Federal level
Yang di-Pertuan Agong: Sultan Mizan Zainal Abidin of Terengganu
Raja Permaisuri Agong: Sultanah Nur Zahirah of Terengganu
Prime Minister: Abdullah Ahmad Badawi
Deputy Prime Minister: Najib Razak
Chief Justice: Ahmad Fairuz Abdul Halim then Abdul Hamid Mohamad

State level
  Johor
Sultan of Johor: Sultan Iskandar
Menteri Besar of Johor: Datuk Seri Abdul Ghani Othman
  Kedah
Sultan of Kedah: Sultan Abdul Halim Muadzam Shah (Deputy Yang di-Pertuan Agong)
Menteri Besar of Kedah: Datuk Seri Madhzir Khalid
  Kelantan 
Sultan of Kelantan: Sultan Ismail Petra
Menteri Besar of Kelantan: Nik Aziz Nik Mat
  Perlis
Raja of Perlis: Tuanku Syed Sirajuddin
Menteri Besar of Perlis: Datuk Seri Shahidan Kassim
  Perak
Sultan of Perak: Sultan Azlan Shah
Menteri Besar of Perak: Datuk Seri Tajol Rosli Ghazali
  Pahang
Sultan of Pahang: Sultan Ahmad Shah
Menteri Besar of Pahang: Datuk Seri Adnan Yaakob
  Selangor
Sultan of Selangor: Sultan Sharafuddin Idris Shah
Menteri Besar of Selangor: Datuk Seri Khir Toyo
  Terengganu
Sultan of Terengganu: Tengku Muhammad Ismail (Regent)
Menteri Besar of Terengganu: Datuk Seri Idris Jusoh
  Negeri Sembilan
Yang di-Pertuan Besar of Negeri Sembilan: Tuanku Jaafar
Menteri Besar of Negeri Sembilan: Datuk Seri Mohammad Hasan
  Penang
Yang di-Pertua Negeri (Governor) of Penang: Tun Abdul Rahman Abbas
Chief Minister of Penang: Tan Sri Dr Koh Tsu Koon
  Malacca
Yang di-Pertua Negeri (Governor) of Malacca: Tun Mohd Khalil Yaakob
Chief Minister of Malacca: Datuk Seri Mohd Ali Rustam
  Sarawak
Yang di-Pertua Negeri (Governor) of Sarawak: Tun Abang Muhammad Salahuddin
Chief Minister of Sarawak: Pehin Seri Haji Abdul Taib bin Mahmud
  Sabah
Yang di-Pertua Negeri (Governor) of Sabah: Tun Ahmad Shah Abdullah
Chief Minister of Sabah: Datuk Seri Musa Aman

Events

January
1 January – Visit Malaysia Year 2007 officially began.
6 January – The opening ceremony for the Visit Malaysia Year 2007 and the Eye on Malaysia ferris wheel was held at the Titiwangsa Lake Gardens, Kuala Lumpur.
9 January – A landslide in Sandakan, Sabah.
10 January – Several parts of Johor were hit by flash floods again.
18 January – Bloggers Jeff Ooi and Ahirudin Attan were sued by the New Straits Times Press (NSTP) for libel.
28 January – Barisan Nasional won a by-election in Batu Talam, Raub, Pahang.

February
2 February – The KLCI passed the 1,200 mark.
February – The El Nino phenomenon began.
23 February – Nusajaya, a planned city in the western part of SJER was launched.
24 February – Malaysia's world smallest microchip with radio technology was launched.
27 February – The KLCI fell 35.79 points from a high of 1272.87 after the global market suffered losses amid fears of capital control. The index continued to plunge 72.40 points for the next three days, to 1,164.68 points, as of 2 March. The index regained its lost points in April 2007.

March
9 March – Six passengers were killed in a bus crash near the Menora Tunnel of the PLUS Expressway around Kuala Kangsar, Perak.
25 March – The Royal Malaysian Police celebrated its 200th anniversary.

April
2 April – Firefly, Malaysia's second low-cost airline and a subsidiary of flag carrier Malaysia Airlines, commenced operations.
4 April – A bomb hoax at the Penang Bridge led to its closure for more than two hours.
6–8 April – Petronas Formula One Malaysian Grand Prix 2007
8 April – Gerakan's party president Lim Keng Yaik retired.
12 April – Barisan Nasional's (BN) candidate Lai Meng Chong won the by-election in Machap, Alor Gajah, Malacca, albeit with a reduced majority of 4,065 votes.
15 April – An UMNO Youth (Pemuda UMNO) parachute team landed at the North Pole.
18 April – Opening of the Kuala Lumpur Courts Complex at Jalan Duta.
26 April – Sultan Mizan Zainal Abidin of Terengganu was installed as the 13th Yang di-Pertuan Agong.
28 April – K. Parthiban of Barisan Nasional won the by-election in Ijok, Kuala Selangor, Selangor with a majority of 1,850 votes.

May
14 May – The motorway tunnel of the SMART Tunnel opened.
17 May – Raja Muda Nazrin Shah of Perak married Zara Salim Davidson.
24 May – 18 Sukhoi Su-30MKM Flanker strike fighter jets were delivered to Royal Malaysian Air Force (RMAF).
28 May – Malaysia's first foreign immigration multipurpose card I-Kad was launched.
30 May – Eight family members were killed in a highway crash in North–South Expressway near Hutan Kampung toll plaza, Alor Setar, Kedah.
30 May – The Federal Court rejected Lina Joy's appeal to get the National Registration Department to remove the word Islam from her identity card.

June
 4 June – The Altantuya murder trial began.
9 June – Prime Minister Abdullah Ahmad Badawi married Jeanne Abdullah.
9 June – An instance of bird flu was detected in Paya Jaras, Sungai Buloh, Selangor.
10 June – Several areas in Kuala Lumpur were hit by flash floods.
23 June – The stormwater tunnel of the SMART Tunnel opened.
26 June – Tycoon Tan Sri Eric Chia was acquitted of committing a criminal breach of trust involving RM 76.4 million after 13 years.

July
6 July – The Companies Commission of Malaysia took four CTOS company officials to court for contravening the Companies Act 1965.
7 July – The construction of the Bukit Tagar Incinerator was cancelled.
7–29 July – Malaysia co-hosted the 2007 Asian Cup.
10 July – Malaysia crashed in a 1–5 defeat to China during the first matches.
15 July – Tengku Mahkota of Pahang, Tengku Abdullah ibni Sultan Ahmad Shah resigned as the Football Association of Malaysia (FAM) Deputy President.
18 July – Six crew were killed when a RMAF S-61 Nuri helicopter crashed at Genting Sempah, Pahang.
30–31 July – Official launching of the Northern Corridor Economic Region (NCER)
31 July – The Rapid Penang bus service was launched.

August
1 August – The Malaysiaku Gemilang theme song was launched.
August – The Merdeka Stadium was officially gazetted by the Ministry of Culture, Arts and Heritage (KeKKWa) as a national heritage and historical building.
5–19 August – Malaysia hosted the Champion Youth Cup Malaysia 2007.
11 August – The completion of upgrading works on the North–South Expressway, including:
Jelapang–Ipoh South non-stop straight route
Rawang–Slim River six-lane carriageway
Seremban–Ayer Keroh six-lane carriageway
13 August – 20 passengers were killed in a bus crash in the North–South Expressway near Bukit Gantang, Changkat Jering, Perak. It is one of the worst road accidents in Malaysian history.
13–19 August – 2007 BWF World Championships were held in Kuala Lumpur.
15 August – The Proton Persona sedan car was launched.
18–30 August – The first Malaysian International Fireworks Competition (MIFC 2007) was held in Putrajaya.
29 August – Malaysia won the 2007 Merdeka Cup, beating Myanmar 3–1.
31 August – Malaysia celebrated 50 years of independence.

September
3 September – Radio24, the only 24-hour news and talk radio station in Malaysia was launched.
7 September – Tabling of Budget 2008 in Parliament.
7–9 September – The Kuala Lumpur International Tattoo 2007 was held in Merdeka Stadium, Kuala Lumpur.
9 September – Riots in Kuala Terengganu after a police crackdown on an opposition political rally.
12 September – The Penang Global City Centre project was officially launched.
21 September – Eight-year old Nurin Jazlin Jazimin, who was abducted on 20 August, was confirmed dead.
27 September – The Kajang–Seremban Highway bridge at Semenyih interchange collapsed onto the Kajang–Semenyih road.
28 September – State and federal officers raided a shop in Section 7, Shah Alam, where they arrested four men and one woman between the ages of 27 and 35 in connection with the murder of Nurin Jazlin Jazimin. The woman was released after questioning, while the men were remanded to police custody for seven days.

October
1 October – 999 became the sole emergency phone number, replacing 991 and 994.
4 October – "Mechanical heart girl" Tee Hui Yee successfully underwent a heart transplant at National Heart Institute (IJN), Kuala Lumpur.
10 October – The first Malaysian angkasawan (cosmonaut), Sheikh Muszaphar Shukor was launched towards the International Space Station (ISS) on board Soyuz TMA-11. He was the first Malaysian to go to space. He was launched at Baikonur Cosmodrome, Kazakhstan.
13 October – Four passengers were killed in a ferry tragedy near Tioman Island, Pahang.
21 October – Sheikh Muszaphar Shukor returns to Earth in a Soyuz TMA-10 capsule.
22 October – The second Malaysian angkasawan (cosmonaut), Dr Faiz Khaleed was promoted to Major by the Royal Malaysian Air Force.
23 October – Official launching of the first Malaysian , .
30 October – Official launching of the East Coast Economic Region (ECER).
31 October – Royal Commission of Inquiry into the Lingam Video Clip was formed to investigate an allegation of illegal intervention into the judicial appointment process of Malaysian judges, which purportedly occurred in 2002.

November

2 November – AirAsia X launched its maiden flight from its base in Kuala Lumpur to Gold Coast, Australia.
10 November – More than 40,000 people in Kuala Lumpur participated in a peaceful rally against corruption in the electoral process in Malaysia.
14 November – The RM4.5 million Perak State Park Corporation's administrative building near Temenggor Lake collapsed.
20–22 November – Malaysian Independence Tennis Festival 2007:
20 November – Clash of Titans: Rafael Nadal vs Richard Gasquet
22 November – Clash of Times: Roger Federer vs Pete Sampras
25 November – More than 30,000 Hindu Rights Action Force supporters in Kuala Lumpur participated in an illegal gathering outside the British High Commission building.
27 November – The first made-in-Malaysia monorail, "Sutra" was launched.
28 November – Guthrie Berhad and Golden Hope merged into one giant plantations company, Sime Darby.
30 November – Malaysia's first portable computer, Makcik PC was introduced by MIMOS.

December

2 December – Three paratroopers were killed in an incident during a practice exercise of LIMA in Langkawi, Kedah.
December – Several parts of the East Coast of Peninsular Malaysia, including Kelantan, Terengganu, Pahang and Johor were hit by flash floods.
8 December – Eight family members were killed in an accident at Gua Musang Highway near Gua Musang, Kelantan.
10 December – PAS vice-president Mohamad Sabu and PKR information chief Tian Chua were among eight people arrested for alleged involvement in the BERSIH rally the previous month.
11 December – Seven people were killed and 28 were injured in a collision between an express bus and a latex tanker at the Jelapang toll plaza near Ipoh, Perak.
13 December – Five HINDRAF leaders including V. Ganabathirau (chief leader) were arrested under the Internal Security Act (ISA).
7–15 December – The Malaysian contingent earned 68 medals in the 2007 SEA Games at Nakhon Ratchasima, Thailand.
21 December – Opening of the Bukit Bunga–Ban Buketa Bridge of Malaysia–Thailand border in Kelantan.
26 December – Two villagers were buried alive in a major landslide, which destroyed nine wooden houses in Lorong 1, Kampung Baru Cina, Kapit, Sarawak.

Births

 3 May – Muhammad Durrani Aufa Muhammad Hafiss – Actor
 2 July – Mohamad Darwisy Amsyar Sahamizam – Actor
 27 September – Aieman Rafique Azman – Actor
 10 November – Muhammad Aidil Ridzuan Abdullah – Actor
 6 December – Muhammad Dzhaffar Uzayr Mohd Shaharuddin – TV host

Deaths
23 January – Syed Hussein Alatas – Former politician, academic and founder of the Parti Gerakan Rakyat Malaysia (PGRM)
15 March – Datuk Wira Poh Ah Tiam – Malaysian politician, senior Malaysian Chinese Association (MCA) official and state assemblyman for Machap, Malacca
4 April – Datuk K. Sivalingam – Malaysian politician, Selangor State Executive Councillor and state assemblyman for Ijok, Selangor
1 June – Kasma Booty – Malay actress
4 June – Loganathan Arumugam (Loga) – Member of the Alleycats band group
3 August – Chong Ted Tsiung – Kuching South city mayor
16 September – Nurin Jazlin — Murder victim (born 1999)
27 September – Tan Sri Michael Chang Min Tat – Federal Court judge
23 October – Tan Sri Lim Goh Tong – Genting Group founder and chairman.
27 October – Tan Sri Othman Saat – Former Johor Menteri Besar (1967–1982)

See also
 2007
 2006 in Malaysia | 2008 in Malaysia
 History of Malaysia
 List of Malaysian films of 2007

References

 
Malaysia
Years of the 21st century in Malaysia
2000s in Malaysia
Malaysia